Interrogations and Confessions is the third album from the Chicago-based band Oh My God.  It was released on October 7, 2003 by NoVo Records and then on October 28 of the same year on the Lightyear Entertainment label, with a slightly altered track listing.

The songs on this album can be considered to have been written in a much more conventional and structured style than on their previous album, The Action Album!

Track listing
All songs by O'Neill/Berkowitz except where noted.

NoVo release
"The Unbearable Pageant" – 3:22
"Torture" – 3:09
"Pearls of Wisdom" – 3:06
"Volatile" – 3:22
"February 14th" – 3:32
"Funhouse Mirror Mother" – 3:19
"Our Loves" – 3:10
"Get Steady" – 3:07
"..." – 0:55
"Shine" (Curt Kirkwood) – 2:44
"Rat-Man" – 1:50
"The Obligation of Joy" – 5:40
"Tom" – 7:16
"Rat-Man's Confession" – 17:09

Lightyear release
"Get Steady" – 3:05
"The Unbearable Pageant" – 3:22
"Pearls of Wisdom" – 3:07
"Volatile" – 3:22
"February 14th" – 3:32
"Funhouse Mirror Mother" – 3:19
"Our Loves" – 3:11
"Torture" – 3:10
"..." – 0:55
"Shine" (Curt Kirkwood) – 2:46
"The Obligation of Joy" – 5:37
"Tom" – 7:16
"Rat-Man" – 1:51
"Rat-Man's Confession" – 17:13

Personnel

Performance

Oh My God
Billy O'Niell – vocals, bass
Iguana – organ, piano, background vocals
Bish – drums

Additional musicians
Anthony Shaw – background vocals
Paul Knegten – percussion
Mike Hari – saw
Megan Cahill – Rat-Man's temptress
Art Auerbach – "neurons in the earthbrain"
Doug McBride – programming, backwards acoustic guitar, ebow, tambourine, mouth percussion
Noble Hibbs – programming, background vocals
Eric Remshneider – cello
Matt Lewis – trumpet

Production
Joey Donatello – producer, mixing, engineering
Doug McBride – producer, mixing, engineering
Mike Zirkel – mixing, engineering
Paul Knegten – engineering
Paul Long – engineering
Noble Hibbs – engineering
Mark Berlin – additional assistance
Joshua Cutsinger – additional assistance
Justin Olsen – additional assistance
Todd Ostertag – additional assistance
Al Sammode – additional assistance
Dan Wean – additional assistance

2003 albums
Oh My God (band) albums